Robert Fortune (16 September 1812 – 13 April 1880) was a Scottish botanist, plant hunter and traveller, best known for introducing around 250 new ornamental plants, mainly from China, but also Japan, into the gardens of Britain, Australia, and the USA. He also played a role in the development of the tea industry in India in the 19th century.

Life
Fortune was born at Edrom, Berwickshire.  After completing his apprenticeship, he was then employed at Moredun House, just to the south of Edinburgh, before then moving on to the Royal Botanic Garden Edinburgh. In 1840 he and his family moved to London to take up a position at the Horticultural Society of London's garden at Chiswick. Following the Treaty of Nanking in 1842, in early 1843 he was commissioned by the H.S. to undertake a three-year plant collection expedition to southern China.

His travels resulted in the introduction to Europe, Australia and the USA of many new, exotic, beautiful flowers and plants. His most famous accomplishment was the successful introduction, although it was not the first by any means,  of Chinese tea plants (Camellia sinensis), along with skilled tea makers, from China to India in 1848 on behalf of the British East India Company. Robert Fortune worked in China for several years in the period from 1843 to 1861. 

Similar to other European travellers of the period, such as Walter Medhurst, Fortune disguised himself as a Chinese merchant during several, but not all, of his journeys beyond the newly established treaty port areas. Not only was Fortune's purchase of tea plants  reportedly forbidden by the Chinese government of the time, but his travels were also beyond the allowable day's journey from the European treaty ports. Fortune travelled to some areas of China that had seldom been visited by Europeans, including remote areas of Fujian, Guangdong, and Jiangsu provinces.

Fortune employed many different means to  obtain  plants and seedlings from local tea growers, reputedly the property of the Chinese empire, although this was some 150 years before International biodiversity laws recognised State ownership of such natural resources. He is also known for his use of Nathaniel Bagshaw Ward's portable Wardian cases to sustain the plants. It is also widely reported that he took skilled workers on contract to India who would facilitate the production of tea in the plantations of the East India Company. The other reason for the failure in India was that the British preference and fashion  was for a  strong dark tea brew, which was best made from the local Assam subspecies (Camellia sinensis var. assamica) and not the selection that Fortune had made in China. The technology and knowledge that was brought over from China was, however, instrumental in the later flourishing of the Indian tea industry in Assam and Sri Lanka.

In subsequent journeys he visited Formosa (modern day Taiwan) and Japan, and described the culture of the silkworm and the manufacture of rice. He introduced many trees, shrubs and flowers to the West, including the cumquat, a climbing double yellow rose ('Fortune's Double Yellow' (syn. Gold of Ophir) which proved a failure in England's climate) and many varieties of tree peonies, azaleas and chrysanthemums. A climbing white rose that he brought back from China in 1850, believed to be a natural cross between Rosa laevigata and R. banksiae, was dubbed R. fortuniana (syn. R. fortuneana) in his honour. This rose, too, proved a failure in England, preferring warmer climates. Today, both of these roses are still widely grown by antique rose fanciers in mild winter regions. Rosa fortuniana also serves as a valuable rootstock in Australia and the southern regions of the United States.

The incidents of his travels were related in a succession of books. He died in London in 1880, and is buried in Brompton Cemetery.

Legacy
Fortune is credited with the introduction of a large number of plants, shrubs, and trees to Europe from China.

Plants named after Robert Fortune

Arundinaria fortunei
Cephalotaxus fortunei
Cyrtomium fortunei
Euonymus fortunei
Hosta fortunei
Keteleeria fortunei
Mahonia fortunei (Berberis fortunei) 

Osmanthus × fortunei  (O. fragrans × O. heterophyllus)
Paulownia fortunei
Pleioblastus fortunei
Rhododendron fortunei
Rosa fortuniana
Saxifraga fortunei 
Trachycarpus fortunei (has synonym Chamaerops fortunei)

In 1913, botanists Rehder and E.H.Wilson named a plant genus from China, with one species, Fortunearia sinensis, in his honour.

Publications
 Three Years' Wandering in the Northern Provinces of China, A Visit to the Tea, Silk, and Cotton Countries, with an account of the Agriculture and Horticulture of the Chinese, New Plants, etc. (1847, John Murray)
 A Journey To The Tea Countries Of China; Including Sung-Lo And The Bohea Hills; With A Short Notice Of The East India Company's Tea Plantations In The Himalaya Mountains. (1852, John Murray)
 Two visits to the tea countries of China and the British tea plantations in the Himalaya: with a narrative of adventures, and a full description of the culture of the tea plant, the agriculture, horticulture, and botany of China (1853, John Murray; LCCN 04-32957; National Library: CAT10983833)
 A Residence Among the Chinese; Inland, On the Coast and at Sea; being a Narrative of Scenes and Adventures During a Third Visit to China from 1853 to 1856, including Notices of Many Natural Productions and Works of Art, the Culture of Silk, &c. (1857, John Murray)
 Yedo and Peking; A Narrative of a Journey to the Capitals of Japan and China, with Notices of the Natural Productions, Agriculture, Horticulture and Trade of those Countries and Other Things Met with By the Way (1863, John Murray)

Biographies
 For All the Tea in China: How England Stole the World's Favorite Drink and Changed History. By Sarah Rose. Viking: 2010. 
 Robert Fortune, A Plant Hunter in the Orient. By Alistair Watt. Royal Botanic Gardens, Kew: 2017.

References

External links

 Plant Explorers: Robert Fortune (1812-80)
 Dreijährige Wanderungen in den Nord-Provinzen von China (German)
 "Dwarf Trees" from Robert Fortune's Books

Botanists with author abbreviations
1812 births
1880 deaths
Scottish botanists
Botanists active in China
Botanists active in India
Botanists active in Japan
Plant collectors
People from Berwickshire
Burials at Brompton Cemetery
People from Duns, Scottish Borders
Scottish travel writers